Pyay Bagaya Intersection is a commercial market square located in Yangon, Burma. That is a most busiest district place in Yangon after Sule Pagoda Roundabout.

Site 
             
The site is bordered on the north by Dagon Centre Shopping Mall, on the east by Gamone Pwint shopping centre, one the south by Padonemar park and one other unknown small park.

Surrounding Buildings 

Sanchaung Intersection square is like Yangon version of New York Time Square. There are a lot of advertising billboards including one LCD TV. Dagon centre shopping mall is one of the city’s busiest, located at a junction of Pyay Road and Bargayar Road. The Itwo4 DJ Lounge, Star Mart supermarket and MK Fashion shop dominate the ground floor. Modern branded shoes, bags and fabrics are on sale and also snack shops and café in the mall include. Some video production companies often come and shoot at Dagon Centre shopping mall. Myaynigone plaza is between Dagon Centre Shopping Mall and Gamone Pwint shopping centre. City Mart super market is a famous super market in Yangon. Video Production Companies also shoot at City Mart. Gamone Pwint shopping centre is just like Dagon Centre Shopping Mall. Padonemar Park is a small park. An unknown park is not a real park. but it has a fountain and a small pound.

History

In 2005, there was a bomb explosion at Dagon Centre Shopping Mall. At least 11 people died in four near-simultaneous blasts in Yangon including Dagon Centre Shopping Mall.

References

Streets in Yangon